The United Arab Emirates competed at the 1996 Summer Olympics in Atlanta, United States.

References
Official Olympic Reports

Nations at the 1996 Summer Olympics
1996
Summer Olympics